The Mental Health (Wales) Measure 2010 is a piece of legislation introduced to Wales by Health Minister Edwina Hart for both Health and Social Services. The measure was passed by the National Assembly for Wales on 2 November 2010.

References

External links
Mental Health (Wales) Measure 2010 as enacted

Measures of the National Assembly for Wales
Mental health law in the United Kingdom
2010 in Wales
2010 in British law
2010 in British politics
Mental health in Wales